The Lincolnshire Offshore Gas Gathering System (LOGGS) was a major natural gas collection, processing and transportation complex in the UK sector of the southern North Sea. It comprised five bridge-linked platforms about 118 km east of the Lincolnshire coast, which operated from 1988 to 2018.

Background 
The development of the Audrey, North Valliant, South Valiant, Vanguard and Vulcan gas fields across several North Sea Blocks (49/11a, 49/16, 49/21, 49/16, 48/25b respectively) required the provision of a central collection, processing and transportation hub to deliver the combined gas output to the onshore Theddlethorpe gas terminal. The LOGGS complex was built to meet these requirements and with provisions to collect gas from future fields.

The LOGGS facility was principally owned and operated by Conoco, this became ConocoPhillips in 2002. Following cessation of production Chrysaor, a subsidiary of Harbour Energy, assumed ownership of LOGGS in 2019.

The LOGGS installation 
The LOGGS installation was located in UK offshore Block 49/16, coordinates 35°23’27”N 02°00’13”E, the water depth is 21 metres.

The installation initially comprised three bridge-linked platforms. These were North Valliant wellhead platform (PD), a Processing platform (PP), and an Accommodation platform (PA). These were commissioned in 1988. To allow lower pressure wells to produce gas a Compression platform (PC) was added to the complex. To cater for production from additional fields a Riser platform (PR) was added to the complex in 1993.

The parameters of the platforms were as follows.

Import and export 
The import and export pipelines connected to the installation were as shown in the following tables. Pipelines were connected to the PP and PR platforms only, there were no pipeline riser connections to the PC, PA or PD platforms.

The export pipelines connected to the installation were as follows.

Process facilities 
Upon arrival at LOGGS PP or PR the fluids from the satellite platforms and subsea completions were routed to their respective 3-phase Inlet Separators, where the fluids were separated into vapour, water/methanol and condensate. Each of these streams was metered. The condensate and methanol/water streams were recombined and routed to a Condensate Surge Drum from where Condensate Pumps injected the liquids into the gas trunk line to Thedlethorpe. There were two condensate handling systems one on PP and one on PR.

Platform PD was a wellhead platform for the North Valiant field designated North Valliant 1. Well fluids were routed across the bridge to PP and combined with fluids from North Valiant SP (North Valiant 2) and flowed to the North Valiant Separator.

Each of the satellite gas streams could be routed to either the suction manifold, the interstage manifold or directly to the discharge manifold depending on the gas pressure. The compression facility had three trains of two stage compression. From the suction manifold gas flowed to the First Stage Suction Drum where liquids were removed. Gas was compressed in the First Stage Compressor and flowed through the Interstage Cooler where it combined with gas from the interstage manifold. The combined gas stream flowed to the Second Stage Suction Drum where liquids were removed. Gas was compressed in the Second Stage Compressor and flowed through the Aftercooler and then to the 36” trunk line to Theddlethorpe.

Fuel gas for powering the compressor and electricity generation gas turbines could be taken from the interstage or the discharge manifolds.

Throughput 
The gas throughput in million cubic metres per year (mcm/y) for some of the fields which flowed through LOGGS were as follows.

Terminal redevelopment 
As a consequence of the LOGGS development new gas reception and processing facilities were commissioned at the Theddlethorpe gas terminal. A second 30-inch line (Feeder No. 17) was laid from the Theddlethorpe terminal to Hatton Lincolnshire where it connected to the 36-inch National Transmission System Wisbech to Scunthorpe line (Feeder No. 7).

Incidents 
In November 2012 there was a major gas release on LOGGS. ConocoPhillips were fined £3 million in the subsequent prosecution.

In May 2016 the Low Pressure Vent Knock Out Drum became liquid locked which led to significant release of gas into the workplace.

Decommissioning 
The Theddletorpe Gas Terminal closed in August 2018. Gas export from LOGGS and its satellite ceased. The following installations were shut-down: Vanguard QD, Vulcan RD, South Valiant TD, North Valiant SP, North Valiant PD, Audrey A WD, Anglia YD, Ganymede ZD, Vampire OD, Saturn ND, a Viking BP. Subsequently their wells were plugged and abandoned and all structures above the seabed were removed.

Gas production from Clipper South, owned by Ineos, was rerouted via a new pipeline to Shell’s Clipped Complex and from there to Bacton Gas Terminal. 

In March 2021 Chrysaor submitted plans to decommission and remove the LOGGS installation. It envisages that the platforms would be removed in 2022-23, debris clearance would continue until 2024 and that close out would be in 2025-26.

See also 

 Arthurian gas fields
 Planets gas fields
 Viking gas field
 Theddlethorpe Gas Terminal
 List of oil and gas fields of the North Sea
Caister Murdoch System
Pickerill and Juliet gas fields
Clipper gas field
A-Fields natural gas fields

References 

North Sea energy
North Sea
Natural gas fields in the United Kingdom